Mary Ellen Pulsifer Ames (1845-1902) was an American botanist.
Along with Rebecca Merritt Austin and her daughter Mrs. Charles C. Bruce, Ames is credited with helping establish "the foundation to our knowledge of the vegetation" of northeastern California. 
She also recorded meteorological data for the Smithsonian Institution.

References

External links
Portrait of Mary E. Pulsifer Ames at the University and Jepson Herbaria Archives, University of California, Berkeley

American women botanists
American botanists
1845 births
1902 deaths